Acelity L.P. Inc., was a privately held medical device company. It was a non-operating holding company whose wholly owned subsidiaries developed advanced wound therapeutics products. The advanced wound therapeutics business was conducted by Kinetic Concepts, Inc. (KCI) and its subsidiaries, including Systagenix. 

The company reported $1.87 billion in annual revenue globally in 2015. 

In October 2019 Acelity Inc. and its KCI subsidiaries worldwide were acquired by 3M.

History
Acelity began as Kinetic Concepts Inc., a medical technology company founded in 1976 by Dr. Jim Leininger, an emergency room physician in San Antonio, Texas. Over time, the company developed or acquired a line of therapeutic specialty beds, introducing a specialty bed for acute care patients with pulmonary complications. Initially KCI's product development focused on therapeutic beds and surfaces then expanded to introduce V.A.C. Therapy, the first commercial negative pressure wound therapy products in the mid-1990s. In 2016, more than 10 million wounds were treated with V.A.C. Therapy worldwide since its introduction. In 2008, KCI acquired LifeCell, a company specializing in regenerative medicine, in a non-hostile transaction for US$1.7 billion. In October 2013, KCI acquired Systagenix Wound Management, originally Johnson & Johnson's professional wound care business for $485 million. In September 2014, KCI's parent company announced that KCI, LifeCell and Systagenix would operate under one global medical technology brand known as Acelity. On December 21, 2016, pharmaceutical company Allergan announced it would acquire LifeCell Corp. for US$2.9 billion. The sale completed on February 1, 2017.

In April 2017, Acelity announced R. Andrew Eckert would replace Joseph Woody as chief executive and president.

Financial information
From the founding of KCI in 1976 to 1988, the revenue of KCI grew to US$153.2 million. The growth in revenue allowed KCI to go public and trade on the New York Stock Exchange (NYSE) for the first time in 1988. KCI stock was traded on the NYSE until 1997, when the company went private. In February 2004, KCI became a publicly listed company for the second time and was listed on the NYSE under the ticker symbol KCI. By the late 2000s, the company's revenue was over $1 billion and reported an increase of 17 percent in 2007 to $1.61 billion. Revenue for 2008 was $1.88 billion, increasing to $1.99 billion in 2009 and in 2010 increased to $2.02 billion. In 2011, the company went private again at a price of $68.50 per share. In August 2015, Acelity filed a registration statement on Form S-1 with the US Securities and Exchange Commission relating to a proposed initial offering of its common stock. On December 7, 2016, the company withdrew its IPO registration statement with the SEC, citing a challenging IPO market.

Mergers and acquisitions
Early 1990s: KCI detailed its operations into four divisions: KCI New Technologies, Inc. (Nutech—organized in 1992 focused on lower-cost technologies), KCI Home Care (organized in 1995 focused on selling wholesale to home medical equipment providers), KCI Therapeutic Services, Inc. (KCTS—rented specialty beds to patients or to hospitals), and KCI International (KCII—organized in 1991 focused on providing the services and products of KCI to foreign countries, including most of Western Europe, Scandinavia, and Australia).

1990: KCI purchased Medirec for $26 million in cash and $10 million in KCI securities, forming KCI's Medical Services Division. KCI later sold KCI Medical Services in September 1994 for $65.3 million in cash and $18.8 million in promissory notes.

1991: KCI purchased Mediscus International, a British competitor in the specialty bed business. The transaction brought KCI products into 10 countries and formed the KCI International subsidiary.

1996: KCI purchased U.K.-based Astec Medical Ltd. The acquisition added four new products to KCI International's product line and allowed KCI to expand its market share in the U.K. community segment.

1997: KCI acquired the Ethos Medical Group. Later that year, Equitron Manufacturing was acquired, adding bariatric products to the Home Care offerings at KCI.

1998: KCI USA was formed as a result of the merger between KCI's New Technologies (NuTech) with KCI Therapeutic Services. The merger united the sales and marketing operations of the two divisions.

2008: KCI acquired LifeCell, a company specializing in regenerative medicine, in a non-hostile transaction for US$1.7 billion.

2013: KCI acquired Systagenix Wound Management, formerly Johnson & Johnson's professional wound care business, for $485 million.

2014: KCI's parent company announced that KCI, LifeCell and Systagenix would operate under one global medical technology brand known as Acelity. That same year, Acelity acquired exclusive worldwide rights from the GID Group, Inc. to develop, manufacture and commercialize the REVOLVE System, a fat processing technology used in both reconstructive and cosmetic procedures to facilitate high-volume, autologous fat grafting. LifeCell previously held exclusive rights to distribute the REVOLVE System in the US and Canada since 2013.

2015: Acelity acquired the SNAP business from Spiracur, Inc.

2016: On December 20, Acelity announced a definitive agreement with Allergan for the acquisition of the company's LifeCell business unit for $2.9 billion in cash.

2017: Acelity completed the sale of LifeCell to Allergan for $2.9 billion in cash on February 1.

2019: Acelity and its KCI subsidiaries worldwide were acquired by 3M for $6.7 billion, including assumption of debt and other adjustments.

References

1976 establishments in Texas
Health care companies established in 1976
Medical technology companies of the United States
Medical device manufacturers
Health care companies based in Texas
Companies based in San Antonio
3M
2019 mergers and acquisitions